Don Milan is a former quarterback in the National Football League. He spent five seasons in the NFL. In his fifth year, with Green Bay, Milan was briefly the Packers' starting quarterback when head coach Dan Devine made a much-publicized midseason trade for Los Angeles Rams quarterback John Hadl.

Early life 
After graduating from Santa Ynez High School, Milan quarterbacked Cal Poly from 1968 through 1970. In his top season of 1970, he threw for 1,236 yards on 64-for-118 accuracy with 11 touchdown passes, and added 479 rushing yards on 89 carries, while earning All-CCAA Team and CCAA Back of the Year award honors and leading Cal Poly to an 8-2 record. 

A speech major, Milan graduated with a total of 2,348 passing yards.

Professional football 
Milan signed as an undrafted free agent with Oakland in April 1971. During the preseason of 1972, Milan threw a 5-yard touchdown pass to Mike Siani in the Raiders' 34-9 exhibition win over the Rams.

In the 1976 preseason, prior to retiring, Milan went 5-of-8 passing for 78 yards against Tampa Bay.

References

See also
List of Green Bay Packers players

1949 births
Sportspeople from Glendale, California
Oakland Raiders players
Los Angeles Rams players
Green Bay Packers players
American football quarterbacks
Cal Poly Mustangs football players
Living people